The following lists events that happened in 1988 in Iceland.

Incumbents
President – Vigdís Finnbogadóttir 
Prime Minister – Þorsteinn Pálsson, Steingrímur Hermannsson

Events

17 November – Linda Pétursdóttir is crowned Miss World at the Royal Albert Hall in London, UK.

Births

15 February  Sævar Birgisson, cross country skier.
18 April – Salka Sól Eyfeld, singer, actress, voice actress, radio host and TV-presenter
27 May – Birkir Bjarnason, footballer
28 July – Gunnar Nelson, martial artist
22 November – Hafþór Júlíus Björnsson, strongman

Deaths

 Alfred Eliasson, businessman (b. 1920)

References

 
1980s in Iceland
Iceland
Iceland
Years of the 20th century in Iceland